The Tashkent Automobile and Road Construction Institute was established in Tashkent, Uzbekistan to cover the high demands for professionals in the transportation and automobile field.

About the Institute 
The Tashkent Institute of Design, Construction and Maintenance of Automobile Roads (TIDCMAR) is an institute in Central Asia which focuses on training engineers on automobile and road construction fields. It was first established during Soviet times by the edict of Uzbek government number 697 on 27 December of the year 1971 and by the edict of "Ministry of Higher and Secondary Education Affairs" number 27 on 21 January of the year 1972 under the base of automobile-road faculty at "Tashkent Poly Technical Institute". The first academic year at the institute started on 1 September 1972.

TIDCMAR's main building is located in the center of Tashkent, near to the metro station "Oybek" and next to the "State Museum of Arts" of Uzbekistan. Tashkent Institute of Design, Construction and Maintanace of Automobile Roads is well known as one of the leading universities of Central Asia in fields of auto-constructing, automobile transports, road and airport construction. The campus of the institute is fully supplied with modern rooms to hold classes, with rooms for experimental subjects and a techno park.

There are 3 academicians from "Uzbek Academy of Sciences", 4 representatives of Uzbek sciences, 38 doctors of sciences, who give their lectures at the university.

There are four faculties at the university and till 2006 the Tashkent Automobile and Road Construction Institute had a special faculty for gifted students. However, nowadays this faculty is closed, meanwhile gifted students are having the chance of studying at the libraries and scientific centers under the institute's administration. Lectures at the institute are mainly given in Uzbek and Russian languages, but gifted students are given chance to have lectures in English language. There are 4000 students who enter the institute every year, to obtain their bachelor's and master's degrees.

The campus of the institute also consists of big library with the 400 thousand books, scientific and literal materials. TIDCMAR has its own polygraphing center and complex of dormitories. TIDCMAR has created big scientific schools for its students which are created by the representative of science in Uzbekistan.

The main role in development of the TIDCMAR plays cooperation with many international universities, local and global corporations. 450 successful graduates from TARCI, who graduated from TIDCMAR between 1978 and 2004, are currently employed in 25 foreign countries.

Nowadays, TIDCMAR is training specialists in 11 branches of bachelor's degree and 17 branches for master's degree. 57 percent of all the teachers at institute have their scientific degrees.

Faculties 

There are 2 big faculties currently acting at TIDCMAR and they are: “Automobile Roads and Artificial structures faculty”, “Maintenance of road building machines and automobile transport  Faculty”. All of the faculties are based on automobile and road constructing.

Transport and Transport Communications Control Faculty 
The main goal of the transport and transport communications faculty is covering high local demands for professionals on transports field. The dean of the faculty is Yuldasheva Saodat Arslanovna.

Road Construction Faculty  
The history of this faculty is linked with the history of the institute, as it was created simultaneously with the TARCI in 1972. The head of the faculty was docent S.X. Xusnitdinov, who controlled the faculty till the year of 1979. In the first years there were 4 departments in the faculty, which were "Automobile Roads Planning", "Exploitation of Automobile Roads", "Road Constructing Materials", "Road Constructing Machines". When it was established there were 117 students engaged with the studies.

In 1979 it was renamed to "Road Construction Faculty". 1972–86 there were 7 departments, 1987–95 there were 12–14 departments, 1995–2000 there were 7 departments and currently there are 4 departments at the faculty. Currently, the dean of "Road Construction Faculty" is Salimova Barno Jamalovna.

Automobile Transport Exploitation Faculty 

The Automobile Transport Exploitation Faculty is the oldest faculty of the institute, it was created even before the TARCI in 1943, under the "Central Asian Industrial Institute", which is now Tashkent State Technical University. However, initially it was established as the department in Mechanics Faculty and was called "Automobiles". First head of the department was G.A. Kuzminov.

On the base of this department "Automobile Roads" faculty was established in 1969. After creation of TARCI 1972 the faculty was given to the institute and was renamed to its current name, which is "Automobile Transport Exploitation Faculty". Nowadays the dean of the faculty is Xakimov Ravshan Muminovich.

The seven departments in the faculty are:
 Technical exploitation of automobiles 
 Heat technology and auto engines 
 Safety 
 Transporting by automobiles 
 Creating of movement safety
 Electro mechanics and automation 
 History

Graduates are currently working at the big automobile concerns and holding of Republic Uzbekistan in leading positions. Graduates from the faculty may also work at automobile factories, in auto transport and auto repairing companies and at many other companies which are mainly focus on automobiles.

Auto Mechanics Faculty 
The Auto Mechanics Faculty is the youngest faculty of TARCI. It was established in 1993 after opening of automobile industry in Republic Uzbekistan with the name of "Automobile utilization". During the years of 1993 to 1995 it was controlled by docent D.R. Kulmuhamedov. However, interest among the applicants decreased rapidly and in order to save the faculty it was mixed with the faculty of "Automobile Transports" in 1995 and was renamed as "Automobile Industry". After 3 years it was reset in 1998 at the "Auto Mechanics Faculty".

There are 6 departments located in the faculty, and they are:
 Automobiles 
 Automobile technology
 Road constructing machines
 Geometry
 Fundamentals of machine planning
 Philosophy

The faculty cooperates with some local and international universities which are: “Moscow Automobile Roads Institute”, “Transport Academy of Kyrgyzstan”, “Tashkent State Technical University" and many others. It also cooperates with some local companies, in order to supply the graduates with jobs after finishing the institute. These are: “Uzavtosanoat”, “Uzavtoyo’l”, “Uzavtoremont” and others.

Currently the dean of the “Auto Mechanics Faculty” is Hikmatov Shukhrat Ismatovich.

Departments 
There are 4 main departments at the TARCI, which have their own sub-departments.

The main departments of the institute are listed below:
 Technical Exploitation of Automobiles
 Uzbek and Russian Languages
 Automobiles and Specialized Transports
 Informatics and Information Technologies

International affairs 

University pays much attention on planning and operating the meetings with many international universities from developed countries, in order to call the highly qualified specialists to Uzbekistan to teach Uzbek students. Nowadays, the institute has many contracts with a number of developed countries of the world. For instance, South Korea, China, Germany, Latvia, Russia, US, Japan, Belarus, Poland, Malaysia and Indonesia.

French universities delegation 

On 30 September 2015 TIDCMAR received a delegation from French universities. The main guest was from the French University called "Reseau n+I 60 engineering university", who was the head of that university called Jan-Pier Trotinyon. During the meeting Mr. Trotinyon gave presentation in English language at the Qualification Center of the TARCI.

The guests from France have also visited the official museum of TARCI and discussed the two-side cooperation issues.

Mechatronics 
TIDCMAR is one of the partners of "Mechatronics" project. The main goal of the project is to produce a new generation of engineers who are capable of performing constructive engineering works in the Mechatronics field meeting today's and tomorrow's technology challenges.

Partners 
EU partners:
KTH Royal Institute of Technology – Sweden, grand holder
KU Leuven – Belgium 
Johannes Kepler University Linz – Austria

Uzbek project partners:
Tashkent Automobile and Road Construction Institute – national/academic project coordinator
Bukhara Engineering Technological Institute 
Fergana Polytechnic Institute
Navoi State Mining Institute
Turin Polytechnic University in Tashkent

Uzbek industry partners:
Navoi Heat Power Plant
Navoi Machinery-building Plant 
JV "UZSUNGWOO" LLC
UAB "Eurasia TAPO-Disk”
Joint Venture "General Motors Powertrain Uzbekistan”
SC "Uzavtosanoat”
Ministry of Higher and Secondary Specialized Education
Scientific-technical park "Computer-Asia"

Rectorate 
Nowadays, the head of the "Maintenance of road building machines.and automobile transport " is doctor of technical sciences Riskulov Alimjan Axmadjanovich.

Location 
The exact location of the "Tashkent Automobile and Road Construction Institute" is Republic Uzbekistan, Tashkent City, 100060, Amir Timur Street, House 20.

See also 

TEAM University Tashkent
Turin Polytechnic University in Tashkent
Inha University in Tashkent
Tashkent State Technical University
Tashkent Institute of Irrigation and Melioration
Tashkent Financial Institute
Moscow State University in Tashkent named M.V Lomonosov
Management Development Institute of Singapore in Tashkent
Tashkent State University of Economics
Tashkent State Agrarian University
Tashkent State University of Law
Tashkent University of Information Technologies
University of World Economy and Diplomacy
Westminster International University in Tashkent

References

External links 
Article about the university in Uzbek checked 27 March 2016
Information about the Institute in Uzbek checked 27 March 2016
Table in English checked 27 March 2016
Information about the Institute in Uzbek checked 27 March 2016

Education in Tashkent
Universities in Uzbekistan
Buildings and structures in Tashkent
Universities and institutes established in the Soviet Union
1972 establishments in the Soviet Union
Vocational education in the Soviet Union